The 1991 SWAC men's basketball tournament was held February 28–March 2, 1991, at the Health and Physical Education Arena in Houston, Texas.  defeated , 70–66 in the championship game. The Tigers lost a play-in game to Coastal Carolina, therefore no SWAC teams reached the 1991 NCAA tournament.

Bracket and results

References

1990–91 Southwestern Athletic Conference men's basketball season
SWAC men's basketball tournament